Steven John Lindsey Croft (born 29 May 1957) is a Church of England bishop and theologian specialising in mission. He has been Bishop of Oxford since the confirmation of his election on 6 July 2016. He was the Bishop of Sheffield from 2008 until 2016; previously he was Archbishops’ Missioner and Team Leader of Fresh Expressions, a joint Church of England and Methodist initiative. He falls within the open evangelical tradition of Anglicanism.

Early life and education 
Croft was born on 29 May 1957. He attended Heath Grammar School in Halifax and studied classics and theology at Worcester College, Oxford, graduating in 1980. From 1980 to 1983, he trained for ordination at Cranmer Hall, Durham. The University of Durham awarded him a Doctor of Philosophy (PhD) degree in 1984 for a thesis titled The identity of the individual in the Book of Psalms .

Ministry 
Croft was ordained as deacon in the Diocese of London on 25 September 1983 by Bill Westwood, Bishop of Edmonton, at St Andrew's Enfield (his title church). The following year, he was ordained as priest by Graham Leonard, Bishop of London, at St Paul's Cathedral on 23 September 1984. From 1983 to 1987 he was curate of the parish church of St Andrew's Enfield. After that, he became vicar of Ovenden, an Urban Priority Area parish in the Diocese of Wakefield, from 1987 to 1996. In 1997, Croft was made a member of the Church of England Evangelical Council, which he was a part of until 2000.

1996–2004: Warden (i.e. head) of Cranmer Hall

2004–2008: Archbishops' Missioner and first Team Leader of Fresh Expressions

Croft was appointed by the archbishops of Canterbury and York to help found Fresh Expressions, a joint Church of England and Methodist initiative "to help Christians of any denomination think about ways of starting and growing fresh expressions of church in their area" where a fresh expression is defined as "a form of church for our changing culture, established primarily for the benefit of people who are not yet members of any church". In recognition of this work he was awarded the silver Cross of St Augustine by the Archbishop of Canterbury.

Episcopal ministry
Croft was nominated as the next bishop of Sheffield, succeeding Jack Nicholls, who retired in July 2008, and formally elected by the Chapter of Sheffield Cathedral in November 2008 (and that election having been confirmed in the interim), he was consecrated as a bishop by John Sentamu, Archbishop of York, on 25 January 2009, at York Minster; and started work in the diocese following his formal enthronement on 9 May 2009.  This was followed by three Welcome Eucharists celebrated in various locations around the diocese to allow more people to meet the new bishop.

In 2012, Croft was nominated by Rowan Williams, Archbishop of Canterbury, to be the Anglican fraternal delegate to the Synod of Bishops in Rome.

Croft became a member of the House of Lords on 15 July 2013. On 12 April 2016, it was announced that he was to be translated to become Bishop of Oxford in "autumn" 2016; he was duly elected to that see and that election was confirmed at Lambeth Palace on 6 July 2016, at which point Croft became the bishop of Oxford. He was (re-)introduced to the Upper House as Bishop of Oxford on 19 July 2016. Croft is the first bishop of Oxford to reside at the new Bishop's Lodge, Kidlington; "for decades" previously, bishops had resided at Linton Road in North Oxford.

Views
In November 2022, he became the most senior Church of England figure to back same-sex marriage, saying clergy should be free to bless or marry same-sex partners and to enter into a same-sex marriage themselves, in contrast to the Church's official position. As a result of this, some evangelicals within his diocese may seek alternative oversight.

Personal life 
Croft was born in Halifax, West Riding of Yorkshire, in 1957. He is married to Ann and has four children.

Protest at his enthronement 
Two survivors of clerical child sexual abuse staged a peaceful protest outside Croft's inauguration as Bishop of Oxford on 30 September 2016. One of them said that he had told Croft three times in 2012 and 2013, when Croft was Bishop of Sheffield, of his rape by a serving priest, but the bishop and other senior figures had failed to respond or take action despite the abuser still being alive. The cover of the protest brochure handed out to the public pictured all six bishops who the survivor claimed had failed to respond, including John Sentamu, Archbishop of York. The survivor commented to the Church Times that he was angry that the church had the "nerve" to enthrone bishops after safeguarding complaints had been made against them. He went on to say  The protest was shown on ITV and the BBC. Croft met with one of the survivors in front of the news cameras.

Police investigation 
In 2018 it was reported in media that Croft was being investigated by South Yorkshire Police, alongside Archbishop Sentamu, Bishop Martyn Snow and Bishop Peter Burrows, for failure to respond properly to a report of clerical child abuse. The priest against whom the allegation was made committed suicide the day before he was due in court in June 2017. The archbishop of York's office said: 

A Guardian editorial contrasted Sentamu's response to a statement from Archbishop Justin Welby at the Independent Inquiry into Child Sexual Abuse, in which Welby stated 

Matt Ineson, the victim of the alleged abuse, called for the resignations of Sentamu and Croft. In May 2018, Archbishop Welby declined to discipline Croft,
and said he "will take no further action" other than ensuring that Croft received further safeguarding training and understood his responsibilities as a diocesan bishop.

Styles
The Reverend Steven Croft (1983–1984)
The Reverend Doctor Steven Croft (1984–2009)
The Right Reverend Doctor Steven Croft (2009–present)

Works 
The Identity of the Individual in the Psalms, Sheffield Academic Press, 1987 
Growing New Christians, CPAS/Marshall Pickering, 1993 
Making New Disciples, Marshall Pickering, 1994 
Emmaus:  the Way of Faith (with Stephen Cottrell, John Finney, Felicity Lawson and Robert Warren), NS/CHP, six volumes, 1996; two volumes, 1998; second edition 200–2003. 
Man to Man: Friendship and Faith, Scripture Union, 1999 
Ministry in Three Dimensions: Ordination and Leadership in the Local Church, DLT, 1999, second edition, 2008 
Travelling Well: A companion guide to the Christian faith (with Stephen Cottrell), NS/CHP, 2000.  
The Lord is Risen: Luke 24, Emmaus Bible Resources 1, NS/CHP, 2002 
Missionary Journeys, Missionary Church: Acts 13-20, Emmaus Bible Resources 2, NS/CHP 2002  
Transforming Communities: Re-Imagining the Church for the 21st Century, DLT, 2002 
A Theology of Christian Leadership in Focus on Leadership, Foundation for Church Leadership, 2005. 
Learning for Ministry (with Roger Walton), CHP, 2005 
Evangelism in a Spiritual Age (with Rob Frost, Mark Ireland, Anne Richards, Yvonne Richmond and Nick Spencer), CHP, 2005 
Moving on in a Mission Shaped Church (booklet with George Lings), CHP, 2005 
Starting a Fresh Expression (booklet with George Lings and Claire Dalpra), CHP 2006 
Listening for Mission (booklet with Bob Hopkins and Freddy Hedley) CHP, 2006 
Bishops’ Mission Orders: a beginners’ guide (booklet with Paul Bayes) CHP, 2008 
Encouraging fresh expressions (booklet), Fresh Expressions, 2008 
The Future of the Parish System: shaping the Church of England for the 21st Century (editor and contributor), CHP, 2006 
The Advent Calendar (a novel for adults and children), DLT, 2006 
Mission-shaped Questions: defining issues for today's church, (editor and contributor), CHP, 2008 
Reflections for Daily Prayer: Advent to 2 before Lent(section on Ecclesiastes), CHP, 2008 
Jesus' People - What the church should do next, CHP, 2009

References

External links
 Croft's blog

1957 births
Living people
Bishops of Sheffield
Lords Spiritual
People from Halifax, West Yorkshire
21st-century Church of England bishops
Alumni of Worcester College, Oxford
People educated at Heath Grammar School
Recipients of the Cross of St Augustine
Alumni of Cranmer Hall, Durham
Staff of Cranmer Hall, Durham
Evangelical Anglican bishops
Evangelical Anglican theologians